Lopp may refer to:
Michael Lopp, represented by the character Rands in the webcomic Jerkcity
William Thomas Lopp, pioneer missionary in Alaska around the end of the 19th century, active in Native American affairs in the United States
Lopp Lagoon, body of water in Alaska named after William Thomas Lopp

See also
LOPP, Polish language acronym for the Airborne and Antigas Defence League in the early to mid 20th century